West Branch Rausch Creek is a tributary of Rausch Creek in Schuylkill County, Pennsylvania. The creek is designated as an impaired waterbody due to metals from abandoned mine drainage. It has no named tributaries.

West Branch Rausch Creek primarily flows through a valley between two mountains: Bear Mountain and Big Lick Mountain. The dominant land use in the watershed of the creek is deciduous forest, although there are more than  each of mixed forest and disturbed land. Mining has been done in the watershed, and two mine pools are present within its boundaries, though one discharges into another watershed. At least one bridge has been constructed across the creek.

Course
West Branch Rausch Creek begins in a large valley between Bear Mountain and Big Lick Mountain, in Hegins Township, near the Schuylkill County/Dauphin County line. It flows east-northeast for several tenths of a mile before passing through a wetland. From the eastern edge of the wetland, the creek continues flowing east-northeast for more than a mile. It then turns northeast for a few tenths of a mile, passing through two ponds, reaching the end of its valley, and joining East Branch Rausch Creek to form Rausch Creek.

Hydrology
The entire length of West Branch Rausch Creek is designated as an impaired waterbody. The cause of the impairment is metals and the probable source is abandoned mine drainage. Despite being impacted by abandoned mine drainage, the creek is not impacted by sediment, unlike the nearby East Branch Rausch Creek.

The pH of the creek has been measured to range from 6.1 to 6.5, with an average of 6.3.

The iron load of West Branch Rausch Creek requires a 94 percent reduction to meet the total maximum daily load requirements for the creek. However, the manganese and aluminum loads only require 55 percent and 28 percent reductions, respectively.

Hay and pastures contribute no sediment to the creek.

Geography and geology

West Branch Rausch Creek drains an area of land between Bear Mountain and Big Lick Mountain. A mine pool known as the Williamstown-Lykens pool is located in the western portion of the creek's watershed. However, it does not discharge in the watershed, but instead discharges into the watershed of Wiconisco Creek via the Big Lick Tunnel.

Some small deep mines and strip mines line the mountain slopes to the north and south of West Branch Rausch Creek. The significant majority of these have not been reclaimed.

Watershed and biology
The creek is entirely within the United States Geological Survey quadrangle of Tower City. Its mouth is located near Tower City.

Cropland occupies  of the watershed, while coniferous forest occupies . Unpaved roads occupy , while hay/pastures occupy .

West Branch Rausch Creek flows through a swamp in its upper reaches. This swamp is situated in Pennsylvania State Game Lands.

The designated use for West Branch Rausch Creek is aquatic life. The creek is classified as a Coldwater Fishery.

History
West Branch Rausch Creek was entered into the Geographic Names Information System on August 2, 1979. Its identifier in the Geographic Names Information System is 1190927.

In 1996, two companiesWenrich Coal Co. and D. and F. Deep Mine Coal Co.applied for renewal of permits for existing anthracite deep mine operations for which the receiving waterbody was West Branch Rausch Creek. One company has a deep mining permit allowing it to discharge into the creek, as of 2001. However, this discharge is only intermittent.

In 2015, Pennsylvania State Game Lands 264 received an additional tract of  near the headwaters of West Branch Rausch Creek from PPL Corporation.

See also
East Branch Rausch Creek, the other named tributary of Rausch Creek
List of rivers of Pennsylvania

References

Rivers of Schuylkill County, Pennsylvania
Tributaries of Mahantango Creek
Rivers of Pennsylvania